Hinduism spread to Nigeria mainly by arrival of Hindus from India and by way of ISKCON. Sindhis were the first to arrive in Nigeria in the early part of the nineteenth century. Initially, they were primarily engaged in trading but gradually, while retaining their interest in trading, they ventured into other fields such as manufacturing and professional services. In succeeding decades, they made substantial investments, aggregating more than US$4 billion. Sindhi names like Chellaram, Bhojson, Chandrai etc are well known in Nigeria.

Hindus of Indian origin 
India and Nigeria were both part of the British Empire. Indians were brought to Africa by the British to build the rail network in Africa. However, most of the Indian population, along with other foreigners from across the Empire, fled to either the United Kingdom, the United States, or back to their country of origin during the Nigerian Civil War. With a fast rising and booming economy that ranks the fifth largest in the world today India has invested over USD 15 billion in Nigeria. There are over 85 well known Indian firms that have set up business in Nigeria creating jobs and opportunities for Nigerians. According to the High Commission of India in Abuja there are an estimated 35,000 Indians in Nigeria.

Starting from the 1970s, the Nigerian government and several private firms began to hire Indian doctors, teachers, engineers and other professionals. Towards the end of the 1980s, many of the Indian experts returned to India when, with the substantial reduction in the country’s oil revenues, the country began to face severe economic problems, unemployment and poverty.

The Government of Nigeria follows a liberal and non-discriminatory policy in the granting of citizenship to resident foreign nationals. As many as 8,000 Nigerians of Indian origin live in the country. Altogether, including Nigerians of Indian origin and expatriates, 25,000 Hindus live in Nigeria. Most reside in Lagos, where there are several Hindu temples.

Hindus of Nigerian origin

Some native Nigerians converted to Hinduism mainly due to efforts of ISKCON. Although most Nigerian Hindus are based in Lagos (Ikorodu, Shomolu, Alimosho, Victoria Island), others are also found in Ibadan (where the Sri Sathya Sai Seva (Service) Organization of Sathya Sai Baba was established in 1972)

ISKCON inaugurated the Vedic Welfare Complex in Apapa, Lagos, launched by the Hare Krishna group in Nigeria.

Sai Organisation 

Sri Sathya Sai Seva (Service) Organization was established in 1972 as a public, charitable trust to carry out the mission of Sathya Sai Baba; providing drinking water, medicine and education to everyone free of charge. A central meeting place named Sri Sathya Sai Baba Centre was built in Ibadan and registered as a non-profit spiritual organization. The site was leased for 99 years with funding from various donors. In Lagos, Sai activities were started in a private house on Victoria Island.

References

External links
African Hindu Council Mobilizes
There is a strong Indian community of about 25,000-30,000 in Nigeria
Indian Diaspora in Africa/ Nigeria

 
Asian-Nigerian culture